Events from the year 1747 in Sweden

Incumbents
 Monarch – Frederick I

Events

 May - Alliance between Sweden and France; Sweden is to receive subsidies. 
 May - Defense alliance between Sweden and Prussia.
 5 December – Carl Gustaf Tessin President of the Riksdag. 
 - The government of the Hats (party) has the physician of the monarch, A. Blackwell, executed for treason. 
 - Pehr Kalm travel to North America.
 The Vadstena adliga jungfrustift begin its activity.

Births

 26 March - Elis Schröderheim, politician  (died 1795)
 - Adolf Ludvig Hamilton, politician, memoir writer  (died 1802)
 24 February - Ulla von Liewen, royal lover  (died 1775)
 - Maria Aurora Uggla, royal favorite  (died 1826)
 - Margareta Seuerling, actress  (died 1820)
 25 July - Johanna Lohm, educator  (died 1834)
 Carl Johan Ingman, spy (died 1813)

Deaths

 19 June – Jakob Benzelius, archbishop  (born 1683) 
 8 August - Mårten Triewald, engineer and physicist (born 1691)

References

 
Years of the 18th century in Sweden